Yom Kippur is the holiest day in Judaism and Samaritanism. It occurs annually on the 10th of Tishrei, the first month of the Hebrew calendar. Primarily centered on atonement and repentance, the day's observances consist of full fasting and ascetic behavior accompanied by intensive prayer as well as sin confessions (traditionally inside of a synagogue). Alongside the related holiday of Rosh HaShanah, Yom Kippur is one of the two components of the "High Holy Days" of Judaism.

Etymology
The common English translation of Yom Kippur is Day of Atonement; however, this translation lacks precision. The name Yom Kippur is based on the Torah verse, "...but on the 10th day of the seventh month it is the day of kippurim unto you..." The literal translation of kippurim is cleansing. Yom Kippur is a Jewish day to atone for misdeeds and become cleansed and purified from them.

Rosh HaShanah and Yom Kippur
Yom Kippur is "the tenth day of [the] seventh month" (Tishrei) and is also known as the "Sabbath of Sabbaths". Rosh Hashanah (referred to in the Torah as Yom Teruah) is the first day of that month according to the Hebrew calendar. Yom Kippur completes the annual period known in Judaism as the High Holy Days or Yamim Nora'im ("Days of Awe") that commences with Rosh Hashanah. The ten days from Rosh Hashanah to Yom Kippur correspond to the last ten days of the 40-day period Moses was on Mount Sinai receiving the second set of tablets.

Heavenly books opened
According to Jewish tradition, God inscribes each person's fate for the coming year into a book, the Book of Life, on Rosh Hashanah, and waits until Yom Kippur to "seal" the verdict. During the Days of Awe, a Jew tries to amend their behavior and seek forgiveness for wrongs done against God (bein adam leMakom) and against other human beings (bein adam lechavero). The evening and day of Yom Kippur are set aside for public and private petitions and confessions of guilt (Vidui). At the end of Yom Kippur, one hopes that they have been forgiven by God.

Prayer service

The Yom Kippur prayer service includes several unique aspects. One is the actual number of prayer services. Unlike a regular day, which has three prayer services (Ma'ariv, the evening prayer; Shacharit, the morning prayer; and Mincha, the afternoon prayer), or a Shabbat or Yom Tov, which have four prayer services (Ma'ariv; Shacharit; Mussaf, the additional prayer; and Mincha), Yom Kippur has five prayer services (Ma'ariv; Shacharit; Mussaf; Mincha; and Ne'ilah, the closing prayer). The prayer services also include private and public confessions of sins (Vidui) and a unique prayer dedicated to the special Yom Kippur avodah (service) of the Kohen Gadol (high priest) in the Holy Temple in Jerusalem.

Observance 

As one of the most culturally significant Jewish holidays, Yom Kippur is observed by many secular Jews who may not observe other holidays. Many secular Jews attend synagogue on Yom Kippur—for many secular Jews the High Holy Days are the only times of the year during which they attend synagogue—causing synagogue attendance to soar.

Preceding day 

Erev Yom Kippur (lit. "eve [of] day [of] atonement") is the day preceding Yom Kippur, corresponding to the ninth day of the Hebrew month of Tishrei. This day is commemorated with additional morning prayers, asking others for forgiveness, giving charity, performing the kapparot ritual, an extended afternoon prayer service, and two festive meals.

General observances 
Leviticus 16:29 mandates establishment of this holy day on the tenth day of the seventh month as the day of atonement for sins. It calls it the Sabbath of Sabbaths and a day upon which one must afflict one's soul.

Leviticus 23:27 decrees that Yom Kippur is a strict day of rest.

Five additional prohibitions are traditionally observed, as detailed in the Jewish oral tradition.

The prohibitions are the following:

 No eating and drinking
 No wearing of leather shoes
 No bathing or washing
 No anointing oneself with perfumes or lotions
 No marital relations

A parallel has been drawn between these activities and the human condition according to the Biblical account of the expulsion from the garden of Eden. Refraining from these symbolically represents a return to a pristine state of re-attachment to the purity of Edenic existence, and symbolically therefore one avoids that which arose as a need only after the exile from Eden: The Eden account tells of God saying "thorns and thistles will grow in your way...the snake will raise its head (to bite you) and you will give your heel (to crush it)" and so in the new post-Edenic existence it became necessary to wear strong protective shoes, and so these are avoided on Yom Kippur. The Eden account also states that as opposed to the automatic food and drink in Eden, it will be necessary to work for it "by the sweat of your brow", and so food and drink are refrained from on Yom Kippur, as well as washing, and the use of cosmetics to remove sweat or its odor etc. Similarly for the description of the post-Edenic relationship between man and woman, and so on Yom Kippur marital relations are avoided.

Total abstention from food and drink as well as keeping the other traditions begins at sundown, and ends after nightfall the following day. One should add a few minutes to the beginning and end of the day, called tosefet Yom Kippur, lit. "addition to Yom Kippur". Although the fast is required of all healthy men over 13 or women over 12, it is waived in the case of any life-threatening medical conditions.

By refraining from these activities, the body is uncomfortable but can still survive. The soul is considered to be the life force in a body. Therefore, by making one’s body uncomfortable, one’s soul is uncomfortable. By feeling pain one can feel how others feel when they are in pain. This is the purpose of the prohibitions.

Virtually all Jewish holidays involve meals, but since Yom Kippur involves fasting, Jewish law requires one to eat a large and festive meal on the afternoon before Yom Kippur, after the Mincha (afternoon) prayer. This meal is meant to make up for the inability to eat a large meal on the day of Yom Kippur instead, due to the prohibition from eating or drinking. 

Wearing white clothing (or a kittel for Ashkenazi Jews), is traditional to symbolize one's purity on this day. Many Orthodox men immerse themselves in a mikveh on the day before Yom Kippur.

In order to gain atonement from God, one must:
 Pray
 Repent of one's sins
 Give to charity

Eve 

Before sunset on Yom Kippur eve, worshipers gather in the synagogue. The Ark is opened and in many communities some of the Sifrei Torah (Torah scrolls) are removed. Two people stand on each side of the Hazzan (in some communities holding the Torah Scrolls), and the three recite (in Hebrew):

In the tribunal of Heaven and the tribunal of earth, we hold it lawful to pray with transgressors.

The cantor then chants the Kol Nidre prayer (Aramaic: כל נדרי, English translation: "All vows"). It is recited in Aramaic, except in the Italian and Romaniote rites where it is recited in Hebrew (Kol Nedarim, Hebrew: כל נדרים). Its name "Kol Nidre" is taken from the opening words, and translates "All vows":

<blockquote>All personal vows we are likely to make, all personal oaths and pledges we are likely to take between this Yom Kippur and the next Yom Kippur (in some versions: which we took between last Yom Kippur and this Yom Kippur), we publicly renounce. Let them all be relinquished and abandoned, null and void, neither firm nor established. Let our personal vows, pledges and oaths be considered neither vows nor pledges nor oaths.<ref>Translation of Philip Birnbaum, from High Holiday Prayer Book''', Hebrew Publishing Company, NY, 1951</ref></blockquote>

The original texted of Kol Nidrei concludes: "as it says: 'May all the people of Israel be forgiven, including all the strangers who live in their midst, for all the people are in fault.'" In the Ashkenazic rite, the words 'as it says' were removed, so this verse became an independent recitation.

If Torah scrolls were removed they are then placed back into the Ark and the Ark is closed.  In some communities there is a brief sermon at this point, and the Yom Kippur evening service begins.

 Prayer services 
Many married Ashkenazi Orthodox men wear a kittel, a white robe-like garment for evening prayers on Yom Kippur, also used in Eastern European communities by men on their wedding day. They also wear a tallit (prayer shawl), which is typically worn only during morning services.

Prayer services begin with the Kol Nidre prayer, which according to some needs to be recited before sunset. Kol Nidre is a prayer that dates back to 9th century Israel. It is recited in a dramatic manner, before the open ark, with the Ashkenazic melody that dates back to the 16th century. Then the service continues with the evening prayers (Ma'ariv or Arvit) and an extended Selichot service.

All of the prayer services of Yom Kippur include litanies and petitions of forgiveness called piyyutim and selichot. Notable piyyutim include HaAderet v'HaEmunah and Mareh Kohen. The morning prayers are recited, followed by Torah reading, followed by an added prayer (Mussaf) as on all other holidays. This is followed by Mincha (the afternoon prayer) which includes a reading (Haftarah) of the entire Book of Jonah, which has as its theme the story of God's willingness to forgive those who repent.

The service concludes with the Ne'ila ("closing") prayer, which begins shortly before sunset, when the "gates of prayer" will be closed. Yom Kippur comes to an end with a recitation of Shema Yisrael and the blowing of the shofar, which marks the conclusion of the fast.

 Reform Judaism 
Reform synagogues generally experience their largest attendance of the year on Yom Kippur and Rosh Hashanah for worship services. The prayer philosophy of Reform, as described in the introduction of the movement's High Holy Day prayerbook, "Mishkan Hanefesh", is to reflect "varied theological approaches that enable a diverse congregation to share religious experience... with a commitment to Reform tradition, as well as [to] the larger Jewish tradition." A central feature of these Reform services is the rabbinic sermon. "For more than a century and a half in the Reform Movement," writes Rabbi Lance Sussman, "High Holiday sermons were among the most anticipated events in synagogue life, especially on the eve of Rosh Hashanah and Kol Nidre night."

 Repentance (Teshuva) and  confessional (Vidui) 

The Talmud states, "Yom Kippur atones for those who repent and does not atone for those who do not repent". Repentance in Judaism is done through a process called Teshuva, which in its most basic form consists of regretting having committed the sin, resolving not to commit that sin in the future and to confess that sin before God. Confession in Judaism is called Vidui (Hebrew וידוי). There is also a commandment to repent on Yom Kippur. Accordingly, Yom Kippur is unique for the confessional, or Vidui, that is part of the prayer services. In keeping with the requirement to repent on Yom Kippur, Jews recite the full Vidui a total of nine times: once during Mincha on Yom Kippur eve, and on Yom Kippur itself during Ma'ariv (two times), Shacharit (two times), Musaf (two times), and Mincha (two times); at Ne’eilah, only the short confessional is said. The first time in each service takes place during the personal recitation of the Amidah (standing, silent prayer), and the second time during the cantor's repetition of the Amidah (except during the preceding Mincha), in a public recitation.

The Yom Kippur confessional consists of two parts: a short confession beginning with the word Ashamnu (אשמנו, "we have sinned"), which is a series of words describing sin arranged according to the aleph-bet (Hebrew alphabetic order), and a long confession, beginning with the words Al Cheyt (על חטא, "for the sin"), which is a set of 22 double acrostics, also arranged according to the aleph-bet, enumerating a range of sins.

 Avodah: remembering the Temple service 

A recitation of the sacrificial service of the Temple in Jerusalem traditionally features prominently in both the liturgy and the religious thought of the holiday. Specifically, the Avodah ("service") in the Musaf prayer recounts in great detail the sacrificial ceremonies of the Yom Kippur Korbanot (sacrificial offerings) that are recited in the prayers but have not been performed for nearly 2,000 years, since the destruction of the Second Temple in Jerusalem by the Romans.

This traditional prominence is rooted in the Babylonian Talmud’s description of how to attain atonement following the destruction of the Temple. According to Talmud tractate Yoma, in the absence of a Temple, Jews are obligated to study the High Priest’s ritual on Yom Kippur, and this study helps achieve atonement for those who are unable to benefit from its actual performance. In Orthodox Judaism, accordingly, studying the Temple ritual on Yom Kippur represents a positive rabbinically ordained obligation which Jews seeking atonement are required to fulfill.

In Orthodox synagogues and many Conservative ones a detailed description of the Temple ritual is recited on the day. In most Orthodox and some Conservative synagogues, the entire congregation prostrates themselves at each point in the recitation where the Kohen Gadol (High Priest) would pronounce God’s holiest name.

The main section of the Avodah is a threefold recitation of the High Priest’s actions regarding expiation in the Holy of Holies. Performing the sacrificial acts and reciting Leviticus 16:30, ("Your upright children"). (These three times, plus in some congregations the Aleinu prayer during the Musaf Amidah on Yom Kippur and Rosh Hashanah, are the only times in Jewish services when Jews engage in prostration, with the exception of some Yemenite Jews and talmedhei haRambam (disciples of Maimonides) who may prostrate themselves on other occasions during the year. A variety of liturgical poems are added, including a poem recounting the radiance of the countenance of the Kohen Gadol after exiting the Holy of Holies, traditionally believed to emit palpable light in a manner echoing the Torah's account of the countenance of Moses after descending from Mount Sinai, as well as prayers for the speedy rebuilding of the Temple and the restoration of sacrificial worship. There are a variety of other customs, such as hand gestures to mime the sprinkling of blood (one sprinkling upwards and seven downwards per set of eight).

Orthodox liturgies include prayers lamenting the inability to perform the Temple service and petitioning for its restoration, which Conservative synagogues generally omit. In some Conservative synagogues, only the Hazzan (cantor) engages in full prostration. Some Conservative synagogues abridge the recitation of the Avodah service to varying degrees, and some omit it entirely. Reconstructionist services omit the entire service as inconsistent with modern sensibilities.

 Date of Yom Kippur 

Yom Kippur falls each year on the 10th day of the Jewish month of Tishrei, which is 9 days after the first day of Rosh Hashanah. In terms of the Gregorian calendar, the earliest date on which Yom Kippur can fall is September 14, as happened most recently in 1899 and 2013. The latest Yom Kippur can occur relative to the Gregorian dates is on October 14, as happened in 1967 and will happen again in 2043. After 2089, the differences between the Hebrew calendar and the   Gregorian calendar will result in Yom Kippur falling no earlier than September 15. Gregorian calendar dates for recent and upcoming Yom Kippur holidays are:

 
 
 
 
 
 
 
 

 In the Torah 
The Torah calls the day Yom HaKippurim (יוֹם הַכִּיפּוּרִים) and in it Leviticus 23:27 decrees a strict prohibition of work and affliction of the soul upon the tenth day of the seventh month, later known as Tishrei. The laws of Yom Kippur are mentioned in three passages in the Torah:
 Leviticus 16:1–34: God told Moses to tell Aaron that he can only enter the sanctuary in front of the cover that is on the ark when God is present on the cover in a cloud. If Aaron is to enter otherwise, he will die. On the tenth day of the seventh month, God said that the people must not work in order to cleanse and atone for their sins. The Kohen will lead in the atonement of all the people.
 Leviticus 23:26–32:  God said to Moses that the tenth day of the month is the day of atonement and will be holy.  The people must give a fire-offering to God and must not work. God told Moses that whoever does work, God will rid of the soul from its people. This is a day of complete rest from the evening of the ninth day of the month to the following evening.
 Numbers 29:7–11: The tenth day of the seventh month is a holy day and one must not work. For an elevation offering, one must sacrifice a young bull, a ram and seven lambs who are a year old. As well, for a sin offering, one must sacrifice a male goat.

 Midrashic interpretation 

Traditionally, Yom Kippur is considered the date on which Moses received the second set of Ten Commandments. It occurred following the completion of the second 40 days of instructions from God. At this same time, the Israelites were granted atonement for the sin of the Golden Calf; hence, its designation as the Day of Atonement.

 Mishnaic and Talmudic literature 

 Temple service 
The following summary of the Temple service is based on the traditional Jewish religious account described in Mishnah tractate Yoma, appearing in contemporary traditional Jewish prayer books for Yom Kippur, and studied as part of a traditional Jewish Yom Kippur worship service.

While the Temple in Jerusalem was standing (from Biblical times through 70 CE), the Kohen Gadol (High Priest) was mandated by the Torah to perform a complex set of special services and sacrifices for Yom Kippur to attain Divine atonement, the word "kippur" meaning "atone" in Hebrew. These services were considered to be the most important parts of Yom Kippur because through them the Kohen Gadol made atonement for all Jews and the world. During the service, the Kohen Gadol entered the Holy of Holies in the center of the Temple, the only time of the year that anyone went inside. Doing so required special purification and preparation, including five immersions in a mikveh (ritual bath), and four changes of clothing.

Seven days prior to Yom Kippur, the Kohen Gadol was sequestered in the Palhedrin chamber in the Temple, where he reviewed (studied) the service with the sages familiar with the Temple, and was sprinkled with spring water containing ashes of the Red Heifer as purification. The Talmud (Tractate Yoma) also reports that he practiced the incense offering ritual in the Avitnas chamber.

On the day of Yom Kippur, the Kohen Gadol had to follow a precise order of services, sacrifices, and purifications:

 Morning (Tamid) offering: The Kohen Gadol first performed the regular daily (Tamid) offering—usually performed by ordinary priests—in special golden garments, after immersing in a mikveh and washing his hands and feet.
 Garment change 1: The Kohen Gadol immersed in a special mikveh in the Temple courtyard and changed into special linen garments, and washed his hands and feet twice, once after removing the golden garments and once before putting on the linen garments.
 Bull as personal sin-offering: The Kohen Gadol leaned (performed Semikha) and made a confession over the bull on behalf of himself and his household, pronouncing the Tetragrammaton. The people prostrated themselves when they heard. He then slaughtered the bull as a chatat (sin-offering) and received its blood in a bowl.
 Lottery of the goats: At the Eastern (Nikanor) gate, the Kohen Gadol drew lots from a lottery box over two goats. One was selected "for the Lord", and one "for Azazel". The Kohen Gadol tied a red band around the horns of the goat "for Azazel".
 Incense preparation: The Kohen Gadol ascended the mizbeach (altar) and took a shovel full of embers with a special shovel. He was brought incense. He filled his hands and placed it in a vessel. (The Talmud considered this the most physically difficult part of the service, as the Kohen Gadol had to keep the shovelful of glowing coals balanced and prevent its contents from dropping, using his armpit or teeth, while filling his hands with the incense.)
 Incense offering: Holding the shovel and the vessel, he entered the Kadosh Hakadashim, the Temple's Holy of Holies. In the days of the First Temple, he placed the shovel between the poles of the Ark of the Covenant. In the days of the Second Temple, he put the shovel where the Ark would have been. He waited until the chamber filled with smoke and left.
 Sprinkling of bull's blood in the Holy of Holies: The Kohen Gadol took the bowl with the bull’s blood and entered the Most Holy Place again. He sprinkled the bull’s blood with his finger eight times, before the Ark in the days of the First Temple, where it would have been in the days of the Second. The Kohen Gadol then left the Holy of Holies, putting the bowl on a stand in front of the Parochet (curtain separating the Holy from the Holy of Holies).
 Goat for the Lord as a sin-offering for Kohanim: The Kohen Gadol went to the eastern end of the Israelite courtyard near the Nikanor Gate, laid his hands (semikha) on the goat "for the Lord", and pronounced confession on behalf of the Kohanim (priests). The people prostrated themselves when he pronounced the Tetragrammaton. He then slaughtered the goat, and received its blood in another bowl.
 Sprinkling of goat's blood in the Holy of Holies: The Kohen Gadol took the bowl with the goat’s blood and entered the Kadosh Hakadashim again. He sprinkled the goat’s blood with his finger eight times the same way he had sprinkled the bull’s blood.  The blood was sprinkled before the Ark in the days of the First Temple, where it would have been in the days of the Second Temple. The Kohen Gadol then left the Kadosh Hakadashim, putting the bowl on a stand in front of the Parochet (curtain separating the Holy from the Holy of Holies).
 Sprinkling of blood in the Holy: Standing in the Hekhal (Holy), on the other side of the Parochet from the Holy of Holies, the Kohen Gadol took the bull's blood from the stand and sprinkled it with his finger eight times in the direction of the Parochet. He then took the bowl with the goat's blood and sprinkled it eight times in the same manner, putting it back on the stand.
 Smearing of blood on the Golden (Incense) Altar: The Kohen Gadol removed the goat’s blood from the stand and mixed it with the bull's blood. Starting at the northeast corner, he then smeared the mixture of blood on each of the four corners of the Golden (Incense) altar in the Haichal. He then sprinkled the blood eight times on the altar.
 
 Goat for Azazel: The Kohen Gadol left the Haichal and walked to the east side of the Azarah (Israelite courtyard). Near the Nikanor Gate, he leaned his hands (Semikha) on the goat "for Azazel" and confessed the sins of the entire people of Israel. The people prostrated themselves when he pronounced the Tetragrammaton. While he made a general confession, individuals in the crowd at the Temple would confess privately. The Kohen Gadol then sent the goat off "to the wilderness". In practice, to prevent its return to human habitation, the goat was led to a cliff outside Jerusalem and pushed off its edge.
 Preparation of sacrificial animals: While the goat "for Azazel" was being led to the cliff, the Kohen Gadol removed the insides of the bull and intertwined the bodies of the bull and goat. Other people took the bodies to the Beit HaDeshen (place of the ashes). They were burned there after it was confirmed that the goat "for Azazel" had reached the wilderness.
 Reading the Torah: After it was confirmed that the goat "for Azazel" had been pushed off the cliff, the Kohen Gadol passed through the Nikanor Gate into the Ezrat Nashim (Women’s Courtyard) and read sections of the Torah describing Yom Kippur and its sacrifices.
 Garment change 2: The Kohen Gadol removed his linen garments, immersed in the mikveh in the Temple courtyard, and changed into a second set of special golden garments. He washed his hands and feet both before removing the linen garments and after putting on the golden ones.
 Offering of rams: The Kohen Gadol offered two rams as an olah offering, slaughtering them on the north side of the mizbeach (outer altar), receiving their blood in a bowl, carrying the bowl to the outer altar, and dashing the blood on the northeast and southwest corners of the Outer Altar. He dismembered the rams and burned the parts entirely on the outer altar.
 Musaf offering: The Kohen Gadol then offered the Musaf offering.
 Burning of innards: The Kohen Gadol placed the insides of the bull and goat on the outer altar and burned them entirely.
 Garment change 3: The Kohen Gadol removed his golden garments, immersed in the mikveh, and changed to a new set of linen garments, again washing his hands and feet twice.
 Removal of incense from the Holy of Holies: The Kohen Gadol returned to the Holy of Holies and removed the bowl of incense and the shovel.
 Garment change 4: The Kohen Gadol removed his linen garments, immersed in the mikveh, and changed into a third set of golden garments, again washing his hands and feet twice.
 Evening (Tamid) offering: The Kohen Gadol completed the afternoon portion of the regular (tamid) daily offering in the special golden garments. He washed his hands and feet a tenth time.

The Kohen Gadol wore five sets of garments (three golden and two white linen), immersed in the mikveh five times, and washed his hands and feet ten times. Sacrifices included two (daily) lambs, one bull, two goats, and two rams, with accompanying mincha (meal) offerings, wine libations, and three incense offerings (the regular two daily and an additional one for Yom Kippur). The Kohen Gadol entered the Holy of Holies four times. The Tetragrammaton was pronounced three times, once for each confession.

 Observance in Israel 

Yom Kippur is a legal holiday in Israel. There are no radio or television broadcasts, airports are shut down, there is no public transportation, and all shops and businesses are closed.

In 2013, 73% of the Jewish people of Israel said that they were intending to fast on Yom Kippur. It is very common in Israel to wish "Tsom Kal" ([an] easy fast) or "Tsom Mo'il" ([a] benefiting fast) to everyone before Yom Kippur, even if one does not know whether they will fast or not.

It is considered impolite to eat in public on Yom Kippur or to sound music or to drive a motor vehicle. There is no legal prohibition on any of these, but in practice such actions are almost universally avoided in Israel during Yom Kippur, except for  emergency services.

Over the last few decades, bicycle-riding and inline skating on the empty streets have become common among secular Israeli youths, especially on the eve of Yom Kippur in Tel Aviv.

In 1973, an air raid siren was sounded on the afternoon of Yom Kippur and radio broadcasts were resumed to alert the public to the surprise attack on Israel by Egypt and Syria that launched the Yom Kippur War.

 Observance by athletes 

Some notable athletes have observed Yom Kippur, even when it conflicted with playing their sport.

In baseball, Sandy Koufax, the Hall of Fame pitcher, decided not to pitch Game 1 of the 1965 World Series because it fell on Yom Kippur. Koufax garnered national attention for his decision, as an example of the conflict between social pressures and personal beliefs.

Hall of Fame first baseman Hank Greenberg attracted national attention in 1934, nearly three decades earlier, when he refused to play baseball on Yom Kippur, even though the Tigers were in the middle of a pennant race, and he was leading the league in runs batted in.  The Detroit Free Press columnist and poet Edgar A. Guest wrote a poem titled "Speaking of Greenberg", which ended with the lines "We shall miss him on the infield and shall miss him at the bat / But he's true to his religion—and I honor him for that."  When Greenberg arrived in synagogue on Yom Kippur, the service stopped suddenly, and the congregation gave an embarrassed Greenberg a standing ovation.

Los Angeles Dodgers outfielder Shawn Green, similarly, made headlines in 2001 for sitting out a game for the first time in 415 games (then the longest streak among active players) on Yom Kippur, even though his team was in the middle of a playoff race. Other baseball players who have similarly sat out games on Yom Kippur include former Boston Red Sox and New York Yankees third baseman Kevin Youkilis, former Houston Astros catcher and former Los Angeles Angels manager Brad Ausmus, and outfielder Art Shamsky.

Gabe Carimi, the Consensus All-American left tackle in American football who won the 2010 Outland Trophy as the nation's top collegiate interior lineman, faced a conflict in his freshman year of college in 2007.  That year Yom Kippur fell on a Saturday, and he fasted until an hour before his football game against Iowa started that night. Carimi said, "Religion is a part of me, and I don't want to just say I'm Jewish. I actually do make sacrifices that I know are hard choices."  In 2004, Matt Bernstein, standout fullback at University of Wisconsin–Madison, fasted on Yom Kippur, then broke his fast on the sidelines before rushing for 123 yards in a game against Penn State.

In 2011, golfer Laetitia Beck declined a request to join the University of North Carolina Tar Heels Invitational competition, because it conflicted with Yom Kippur.  Instead, she spent the day fasting and praying.  She said: "My Judaism is very important to me, and ... on Yom Kippur, no matter what, I have to fast."  Boris Gelfand, Israel's top chess player, played his game in the prestigious London Grand Prix Chess Tournament on 25 September 2012 (eve of Yom Kippur) earlier, to avoid playing on the holiday.

In 2013, the International Tennis Federation fined the Israel Tennis Association "more than $13,000 ... for the inconvenience" of having to reschedule a tennis match between the Israeli and Belgian teams that was originally scheduled on Yom Kippur. Dudi Sela, Israel's #1 player, quit his quarterfinal match in the third set of the 2017 Shenzhen Open so he could begin observing Yom Kippur by the time the sun set, forfeiting a possible $34,000 in prize money and 90 rankings points.

Professional wrestler Bill Goldberg has a policy of not performing on Yom Kippur.

Recognition by the United Nations
Since 2016 the United Nations has officially recognized Yom Kippur, stating that from then on no official meetings would take place on the day. In addition, the United Nations stated that, beginning in 2016, they would have nine official holidays and seven floating holidays of which each employee would be able to choose one. It stated that the floating holidays will be Yom Kippur, Day of Vesak, Diwali, Gurpurab, Orthodox Christmas, Orthodox Good Friday, and Presidents' Day. This was the first time the United Nations officially recognized any Jewish holiday.

Modern scholarship
According to textual scholars, the biblical regulations covering Yom Kippur are spliced together from multiple source texts,Cheyne and Black, Encyclopedia Biblica as indicated by the duplication of the confession over the bullock, and the incongruity in one verse stating that the high priest should not enter the Holy of Holies (with the inference that there are exceptions for certain explicitly identified festivals), and the next verse indicating that they can enter whenever they wish (as long as a specific ritual is carried out first). Although Rashi tried to find a harmonistic explanation for this incongruity, the Leviticus Rabbah maintains that it was indeed the case that the high priest could enter at any time if these rituals were carried out. Textual scholars argue that the ritual is composed from three sources, and a couple of redactional additions:
prerequisite rituals before the high priest can enter the Holy of Holies (on any occasion), namely a sin offering and a whole offering, followed by the filling of the Holy of Holies with a cloud of incense while wearing linen garments
regulations which establish an annual day of fasting and rest, during which the sanctuary and people are purified, without stating the ritual for doing so; this regulation is very similar to the one in the Holiness Code
later elaborations of the ceremony, which include the sprinkling of the blood on the mercy seat'', and the use of a scapegoat sent to Azazel; the same source also being responsible for small alterations to related regulations
the redactional additions

On the basis of their assumptions, these scholars believe that the original ceremony was simply the ritual purification of the sanctuary from any accidental ritual impurity, at the start of each new year, as seen in the Book of Ezekiel. Textual scholars date this original ceremony to before the priestly source, but after JE. According to the Book of Ezekiel, the sanctuary was to be cleansed by the sprinkling of bullock's blood, on the first day of the first and of the seventh months—near the start of the civil year and of the ecclesiastical year, respectively; although the masoretic text of the Book of Ezekiel has the second of these cleansings on the seventh of the first month, biblical scholars regard the Septuagint, which has the second cleaning as being the first of the seventh month, as being more accurate here. It appears that during the period that the Holiness Code and the Book of Ezekiel were written, the new year began on the tenth day of the seventh month, and thus liberal biblical scholars believe that by the time the Priestly Code was compiled, the date of the new year and of the day of atonement had swapped around.

See also
 Ashura
 Break fast

Notes

References

External links

 Rosh Hashanah and Yom Kippur Prayers for Sephardic Jews 
 From Our Collections: Marking the New Year – Online exhibition from Yad Vashem on the celebration of Rosh Hashanah and Yom Kippur before, during, and after the Holocaust
  Dates for Yom Kippur
 Yom Kippur Prayers sung by Chazzanim
 More information on Yom Kippur

 
Book of Leviticus
Tishrei observances